Varqaneh (also Romanized as Varghāneh and Warghaneh) is a village in Shakhenat Rural District, in the Central District of Birjand County, South Khorasan Province, Iran. At the 2006 census, its population was 128, in 39 families.

References 

Populated places in Birjand County